The Moodies Group is a geological formation in South Africa and Eswatini. It has the oldest well-preserved siliciclastic tidal deposits on Earth, where microbial mats flourished.

See also 
 Archean life in the Barberton Greenstone Belt
 Fig Tree Formation
 Onverwacht Group

References 

Geologic groups of Africa
Geologic formations of South Africa
Geology of Eswatini
Archean Africa
Fossiliferous stratigraphic units of Africa
Paleontology in South Africa
Origin of life